Kamel Hothi, OBE (Punjabi: ਕਮਲ ਹੋਥੀ) (born in 1962 in India) is a British banker and financial adviser.

Career

Hothi has worked at Lloyds Bank since about 1979.  Kamel became TSB's first female manager in the South-east and the bank's first Asian manager.  She is ranked in the top 100 most influential black, Asian and minority ethnic leaders in the UK.

She is credited with developing the Asian Strategy across the Lloyds Banking Group in Britain, which improved access to finance for Ethnic communities.   

She is an advisory board member of the Queen’s Commonwealth Trust Fund setup in 2018 aimed at connecting young leaders who are working hard to change the world.  and a trustee of the Memusi Foundation, a charity that funds education in Kenya and Tanzania.

Awards and recognition 
In the 2017 Birthday Honours, Kamel was appointed an Officer of the Order of the British Empire for services to promoting diversity in banking.   She received an honorary degree in 2011 by the World Sikh University for being the architect behind the Asian strategy across Lloyds Banking Group. 

In addition she has received a wide range of awards recognising her professional achievements including:

 Accountancy & Finance award at the British Indian Awards in 2013 

 Ranked the Top 10 Diversity Champion in the UK by the Prime Minister Gordan Brown in 2010 

 Professional Woman of the Year award at the Asian Achievers Awards in 2008 

 Sikh Women in the Community award at the Vaisakhi festival by Mayor of London 2007

See also 

 List of British Sikhs

References 

1962 births
Living people